Bridge in Bangor Borough is a historic concrete arch bridge spanning Martins Creek at Bangor, Northampton County, Pennsylvania. It was built in 1915, and is a small, single arched bridge spanning 45 feet. It features molded ornamental designs on the spandrel walls and abutments.

It was added to the National Register of Historic Places in 1988.

References

Road bridges on the National Register of Historic Places in Pennsylvania
Bridges completed in 1915
Bridges in Northampton County, Pennsylvania
National Register of Historic Places in Northampton County, Pennsylvania
Concrete bridges in the United States